JA Douglas McCurdy Sydney Airport  is a regional airport located in Reserve Mines in the Canadian province of Nova Scotia. The airport serves the Cape Breton Regional Municipality (CBRM) and the surrounding areas of Cape Breton Island. McCurdy Sydney Airport has the distinction of being the oldest public airport in Nova Scotia, first licensed on August 3, 1929.

The airport features two runways and one passenger terminal, along with several hangars and maintenance facilities.

Nav Canada classifies Sydney as an airport of entry by and as such is staffed by the Canada Border Services Agency (CBSA). CBSA officers at this airport can handle aircraft with no more than 44 passengers, or with staged offloading of up to 200 passengers.

Airlines and destinations

Facilities

Terminal
The present Air Terminal Building (ATB) was opened in 1967, and, upon opening, included immigration and customs facilities for international passengers; a restaurant, lounge, gift shop, and car rentals, as well as other amenities for air travelers; a control tower and administrative offices. The terminal has undergone renovations and an expansion over the years. Today, the terminal serves over 180,000 passengers per year.

In addition to passenger services the airport provides facilities and services to business travelers including a boardroom and business centre available for rental.

Runways and taxiways
There are two runways at McCurdy, one with ILS-I capabilities and the other served by RNAV. The two runways, 06/24 and 18/36, are approximately aligned in the east-west and north-south direction and are served by two taxiways.

Operations
The airport serves general aviation, charter and business aircraft with a tarmac with built-in tie downs, self-serve pay-at-the-pump aviation fuel 100LL, a crew room and hangar facilities, catering is available onsite. Jet fuel provided by ASIG (Aircraft Service International Group / Menzies); Ground handling services provided by Airconsol Aviation.

Private and charter aircraft services
Private aircraft operators have the choice of self-handling, or they can arrange for full FBO (fixed-base operator) services with Gateway Sydney FBO. Hangarage and Helicopter charter services are available on site through Gateway Sydney FBO.

Statistics

Ground transportation

Car
The airport is located on Nova Scotia Trunk 4. It is a 14-minute drive from Downtown Sydney and a 12-minute drive from Glace Bay. There is onsite parking with daily, weekly and yearly rates.

Taxi
City Wide Taxi provides service at the airport. Arrangements can be made in advance.

Rented car
Avis, Budget and National/Enterprise car rental agencies are located in the air terminal building.

History

1928 - The Cape Breton Flying Club
By the late 1920s the Canadian government, in hopes of building the nation's aviation sector, made it policy to encourage the establishment of local flying clubs that could lead to increased flight training and the development of community airfields across the country. An Order-in-Council was passed in September 1927 and the Controller of Civil Aviation was tasked with supporting and approving the creation of these flying clubs.

Through this flying club movement the Cape Breton Flying Club was formed in 1928, and in 1929 the club opened an aerodrome on land located along Grand Lake Road, near the community of Reserve, leased from one of its members, Dan MacMillan. The first aircraft to land at the new Cape Breton Flying Club Field was a Buhl Airsedan, named Bluenose, owned by Rollie D. Archibald and flown from San Francisco by Vernon Dorell, arriving at the airfield on June 6, 1929. The flight took thirty hours to complete.

On August 3, 1929, the site was given a temporary airport licence and was listed as a Public Airport in the 1929 List of Licenced Public Airports, Intermediate and Private Aerodromes, Public Seaplane Ports, Seaplane Anchorages in Canada with the following runways:

The club operated the airport through the 1930s primarily for local air traffic, visiting aviators, and pilot training. From 1929 through at least to 1940 the club operated a number of different Avro 616 Avian IVM aircraft, registrations CF-CAY, CF-CAZ, CF-CDE, CF-CDF, and CF-CDG, and at least one De Havilland DH.60 Moth, registration CF-CED.

1937 to 1945 - RCAF Aerodrome - Sydney
In 1937 the government chose a site near the Cape Breton Flying Club's air strip for a new aerodrome for the Royal Canadian Air Force, and in 1938 began construction of the aerodrome which included three four-thousand foot runways. By December of 1940, as the new airdrome was nearing completion, No. 8 (BR) Squadron moved operations to Sydney from its former base at Kelly Beach in North Sydney. The new airport was operated through World War II as a RCAF Aerodrome with 8 Squadron tasked with anti-submarine duty while serving with RCAF Eastern Air Command. The RAF Ferry Command and the Return Ferry Service used Sydney as a staging point and as an alternate on their transatlantic operations.

The field was listed as "all hard surfaced" and had three runways listed as follows:

By May of 1942 Sydney Airport had become a regular stop on Trans-Canada Airlines's passenger service which was operating flights across Canada, connecting Sydney to Moncton, New Brunswick, and St. John's, Newfoundland, with the cost per ticket for inter-airport flight, Sydney-Gander or Sydney-St. John's at $8.00.

Post-World War II
In December 1945, with hostilities at an end, the RCAF handed control of the airport over to the Department of Transport to develop into a civilian aerodrome. All the buildings not required by Transport were declared surplus and sold; the airport was designated as an alternate for the North Atlantic air route, and a licence was issued on March 10, 1947.

Trans-Canada Airlines continued their passenger service to Sydney, with flights from Halifax to Sydney increased to two each day. By 1948 direct operations between Sydney, Moncton, and Saint John's were in place.

1950s through 1990s
In March 1962, runway 14-32 was closed because of its poor condition. A large-scale rebuilding program followed, which included the construction of a new terminal building in 1967.

The western half of the runway 14-32 was reactivated for summer operation in 1976. The ILS (Instrument landing system) on runway 07 was replaced in 1977, and VASIS (Visual approach slope indicator) was installed on runway 25. A new ILS was installed on runway 19 in 1978 to replace one destroyed in a storm in October 1974. The main ramp and taxiway K were extended in 1982.

By 1988 Sydney was served by Air Canada, Canadian Airlines, Air Nova, Air Atlantic, and Air Saint-Pierre. Cape Breton Flying School, Eastern Flying Services Ltd., Versatile Air Services, and Bras d'Or Construction were also based at the airport.  Sydney Airport had 183,000 passengers and 17,462 aircraft movements.

1997 divestiture and Sydney Airport Authority
The Sydney Airport Authority was created on 7 April, 1997. As a result of the National Airports Policy of 1994, Transport Canada was undergoing a program of commercializing and divesting itself of airports, the air navigation system, and ports and harbours across Canada. As a result, on October 1, 1997, ownership of Sydney Airport was transferred to the Sydney Airport Authority who continue to own and operate the airport to this day.

Renaming
On July 27, 2009, the Sydney Airport was renamed after John Alexander Douglas McCurdy, a Canadian aviation pioneer who set a series of aviation records, the first British subject to fly a heavier-than-air machine, and the first Canadian to pilot a flying machine in Canada when he flew the Silver Dart off the ice in Baddeck. He was also the holder of Canada's first pilot's licence. He established the first aviation school in Canada, the Curtiss Flying School, and was the first manager of Long Branch Aerodrome, Canada's first airport. At the beginning of the Second World War, McCurdy became Assistant Director General of Aircraft Production. In 1947, McCurdy was appointed Lieutenant Governor of Nova Scotia, a post he continued until 1952.

Misidentification for Sydney, Australia
Over the years, several travellers have been sent to this airport after they or their travel agents mistook it for the Sydney Airport in Australia. The most recent was on March 31, 2017 when a Dutch traveller booked his own flight.

References

Citations

Bibliography

External links

Sydney Airport Authority, Official Website
Gateway Sydney Airport (YQY) FBO - Fixed Base Operator

Certified airports in Nova Scotia
Transport in the Cape Breton Regional Municipality
Sidney, Nova Scotia